Maureen Elizabeth Hobbs is a female former international lawn bowler from New Zealand.

She won a silver medal in the women's pairs with Edda Bonutto at the 1990 Commonwealth Games in Auckland.

References

Living people
Australian female bowls players
Commonwealth Games silver medallists for Australia
Commonwealth Games medallists in lawn bowls
Bowls players at the 1990 Commonwealth Games
Year of birth missing (living people)
Medallists at the 1990 Commonwealth Games